The NM-02 (abbreviated from the Spanish: Neumático Mexicano 2002) is a rubber-tyred model of electrical multiple units used on the Mexico City Metro, first used in 2005 and currently servicing Line 2 and Line 7.

History
In 2003, as part of a plan to modernize Mexico City Metro, Mexico City's government acquired 45 new NM-02 units to be used in Line 2 with a cost of 550 million dollars. Out of those 45 trains, 31 were already in service during 2005. The trains that were replaced by NM-02 in Line 2, were sent to be serviced in order to be transferred for their use in other lines. 

The trains were manufactured by Canadian Bombardier and Spanish Construcciones y Auxiliar de Ferrocarriles (CAF). 17 units were provided by CAF and the rest by Bombardier.

CAF had previously supplied trains for the Mexico City Metro with the NE-92.

In 2011, STC retired MP-68 units from service in Line 7 and replaced them with NM-02 trains, which had been already servicing Line 7 with a few leased units from Line 2 since 2009.

Description
A NM-02 trainset has nine cars which are interconnected, allowing passengers to change from one car to another. Also, the units have a sound system that gives safety announcements to the passengers as well as a voice recording that announces the station the train is in and the next station. This was the first model to have this features to be used in Mexico City Metro system. 

In 2010, to commemorate the Bicentenary of the Mexican War of Independence and the Centenary of the Mexican Revolution, Line 2 trains were decorated with liveries showing pictures and phrases of historical figures of both events such as Miguel Hidalgo, Vicente Guerrero, Álvaro Obregón and Francisco I. Madero.

Technical specifications
The following are the NM-02 specifications.

Length: 
Width: 
Height: 
Composition: Mc+T+M+M+T+M+M+T+Mc
Passenger capacity: 1460 passengers (a density of )

Equipment
NM-02 units are equipped with the following.

Onboard computer system with cab monitoring terminal and light signal box
Wi-Fi
Event recorders
Radio-telephone system
Passenger and cab ventilation system
Information and communication system
Emergency brake handles
Halogen lamps

References

Mexico City Metro rolling stock
750 V DC multiple units
Rolling stock of Mexico